

The Aéro Services Guépard Guépard 912 is a French two-seat microlight cabin monoplane designed and built by Aéro Services Guépard to meet the FAI Microlight standard, it is also sold as a kit of parts for amateur construction.

The Guépard 912 is a cabin monoplane with a braced high-mounted wing, it has a fixed tricycle landing gear and an enclosed cabin for two sitting in side-by-side configuration. The Guépard is built from welded steel tube with aircraft fabric covering but is also available with a riveted steel covering. Although capable of using a range of engines with power outputs from  the  Rotax 912 or the  Rotax 912S are normally used.

Specifications

References

Notes

Bibliography

External links
 

2000s French civil utility aircraft
Homebuilt aircraft
Guépard